Hemilissopsis fernandezae is a species of beetle in the family Cerambycidae. It was described by Hovore and Chemsak in 2006.

References

Elaphidiini
Beetles described in 2006